Changing Times is the seventh studio album by Australian singer-songwriter, Jon Stevens. The album was released digitally only on 9 September 2011.
It was later released on CD as part of a deluxe version of the Testify! album.

The album was announced via a press release on 22 August 2011, where Stevens announced he'd signed with Universal Music Australia. In a statement, he said; "I am very excited to have signed with Universal music & commencing work on promoting the release of my new album Changing Times. This is sure to be a great end to the year and the start of a great future ahead!"
 
Stevens promoted the album with a  national tour throughout October 2011.

Track listing
Digital Download
 "One Mistake" - 3:51
 "Acid Tongue" - 3:23
 "Living The Life"	- 4:07
 "Maybe Baby" - 3:32
 "Just a Man" - 3:48
 "These Are the Days" - 3:32
 "Stare"	- 3:36
 "Kamikaze Pilot" - 3:39
 "No Surrender" - 3:13
 "Closer to God" - 3:41
 "Changing Times" - 2:42

Release history

References

2011 albums
Universal Music Australia albums
Jon Stevens albums